Wise is a surname. Notable people with the surname include:

 Anna Wise (born 1991), American singer 
 Audrey Wise (1935–2000), United Kingdom politician
 Bernhard Wise (1858–1916), Australian politician
 Bob Wise (born 1948), American politician
 Brownie Wise (1913–1992), American saleswoman who developed "party plan" marketing 
 Christopher Wise (born 1961), American author 
 Cody Wise, American singer
 Daniel Wise (disambiguation), several people, including
 Daniel Wise (American football) (born 1996), American football player
 Daniel Wise (author) (1813–1898), Methodist Episcopal clerical author
 Daniel Wise (playwright), American contemporary playwright, producer, and author
 Daniel Wise (mathematician) (born 1971), American mathematician
 David Wise (disambiguation), several people, including
 David Wise (composer), British video game music composer
 David Wise (cricketer) (born 1963), English cricketer
 David Wise (freestyle skier) (born 1990), American Olympic gold medalist
 David Wise (journalist) (1930–2018), American investigative journalist and writer
 David Wise (writer) (1955–2020), American television writer
 Deatrich Wise (born 1965), American football player
 Deatrich Wise Jr. (born 1994), American football player
 Dennis Wise (born 1966), English footballer
 DeWayne Wise (born 1978), American baseball player
 Doc Wise (born 1967), American football player
Dwight Wise (1930–2020), American politician.
 Ernie Wise (1925–1999), British comedian
Fred Wise (disambiguation), several people
Fred Wise (physician) (1881–1950), American dermatologist
Fred Wise (songwriter) (1915–1966), American lyricist who wrote songs for Elvis Presley
 Frederick Wise, 1st Baron Wise (1887–1968), British Labour Party politician
 Fredric Wise (1871–1928), British Conservative Party politician
 George Wise (disambiguation), several people, including
 George Wise (Australian politician) (1853–1950), Australian politician and solicitor
 George Wise (rugby union) (1904–1971), New Zealand rugby union player
 George D. Wise (Union) (1816–1881), Union Army officer during the American Civil War
 George D. Wise (politician) (1831–1898), U.S. Representative from Virginia
 George S. Wise (1906–1987), American Jewish sociologist
 Glenn M. Wise American politician
 Henry Wise (disambiguation), several people, including
 Henry Wise (footballer) (born 2000), English professional footballer
 Henry Wise (gardener) (1653–1738), English gardener, designer, and nurseryman
 Henry Wise (merchant) (1802–1866), English mariner and merchant
 Henry Wise (publisher) (1835–1922), New Zealand publisher
 Henry A. Wise (1806–1876), Governor of Virginia
 Henry A. Wise (attorney), United States Attorney for the Southern District of New York (1909–13)
 Henry Wise Jr. (1920–2003), American physician and World War II Tuskegee Airman fighter pilot
 Henry A. Wise (New York state senator) (1906–1982), New York politician
 Henry Augustus Wise (1819–1869), author and U.S. Naval Officer
 Henry Seiler Wise (1909–1982), United States federal judge
 Henry Christopher Wise (1806–1883), English politician
 Isaac Mayer Wise (1819–1900), American Reform rabbi and author
 James H. Wise (politician) (1912–1976), American politician
 John Wise (disambiguation), several people, including:
 John Wise (Australian politician) (1856–1942), New South Wales politician
 John Wise (balloonist) (1808–1879), American ballooning pioneer
 John Wise (Canadian politician) (1935–2013)
 John Wise (clergyman) (1652–1725), Massachusetts divine who protested taxation
 John Wise (footballer) (born 1954), Australian footballer
 John Wise (Canadian politician) (1935–2013), Progressive Conservative MP and federal Minister of Agriculture
 John Wise (sport shooter) (1901–1971), Australian, competed at the 1948 Olympic Games
 John Wise (Virginia politician) (fl. 1768–1812), Speaker of Virginia House of Delegates
 John A. Wise (1939–2011), American scientist
 John Ayshford Wise (1810–1865), British MP for Stafford
 John Henry Wise (1868–1937), Hawaiian politician
 John Richard de Capel Wise (1831–1890), British writer
 John Sergeant Wise (1846–1913), American Congressman
 Josh Wise (born 1983), NASCAR driver
 Korey Wise (born 1972), American activist
 Kurt Wise, American creationist
 Leo Wise (1849–1933), American newspaper editor and publisher
 Louise Waterman Wise (1874–1974), American social worker and artist
 Mark B. Wise (born 1953), physicist
 Matt Wise (born 1975), baseball player
 Max Wise (born 1975), American former FBI agent, serving as a member of the Kentucky Senate
 Michael Wise (disambiguation), several people, including
 Michael John Wise (1918–2015), British geographer
 Mike Wise (American football) (1964–1992), American football defensive end
 Mike Wise (American columnist), sports and feature writer for The Washington Post
 Mike Wise (politician), member of the Ohio House of Representatives
 Rev. Percy W. Wise "Canon Wise" (1870–1950), Anglican priest in South Australia
 Ray Wise (born 1947), American actor
 Richard Alsop Wise (1843–1900), US politician of political family
 Rick Wise (born 1945), American baseball player
 Robert Wise (1914–2005), American film producer and director
 Seelig Wise (1913–2004), American farmer and politician
 Stephen Wise (disambiguation), several people, including
 Stephen Samuel Wise (1874–1949), American rabbi and Zionist leader
 Stephen R. Wise (born 1941), member of the Florida Senate
 Steven M. Wise (born 1952), American legal scholar
 Sue Wise (born 1953), English feminist author
 Tim Wise, American anti-racist activist
 Thomas Wise (disambiguation), several people
 Sir Thomas Wise (died 1630) (died 1629), English politician, MP for Bere Alston, 1621
 Thomas James Wise (1859–1937), manuscript forger
 Thomas Wise (died 1641) (c. 1605 – 1641), English politician
 Thomas Wise (priest) (1671–1726), clergyman of the Church of England
 Thomas A. Wise (1865–1928), American actor and president of The Lambs
 Thomas Dewey Wise (born 1939), American politician in the state of South Carolina
 Tom Wise (born 1948), Independent and UKIP member of the European Parliament
 Wes Wise (1928-2022), American journalist and politician
 Willie Wise, American basketballer born 1947
 William Wise (disambiguation), several people, including
 William Furlong Wise, British Naval officer
 William Wise III, American basketballer born 1992
 Willy Wise, American boxer

See also 

 Wise (disambiguation)

Surnames
Surnames of British Isles origin
Surnames of English origin
Surnames of Scottish origin
English-language surnames
Surnames from nicknames